K'ank'awini (Aymara k'ank'a opening, gap; crevice, -wi, -ni suffixes, "the one with a place of crevices", Hispanicized spelling Cancavine) is a  mountain in the Andes of southern  Peru. It is situated in the Moquegua Region, Mariscal Nieto Province, Torata District. K'ank'awini lies west of Apachita Limani.

References

Mountains of Peru
Mountains of Moquegua Region